Joerg Hasford (born 1950 in Munich) is a German physician, biometrician, and epidemiologist. He is emeritus professor in the Institute for Medical Informatics, Biometry and Epidemiology at Ludwig Maximilian University of Munich, chair of the Ethics Committee of the Physicians’ Chamber of the Free State of Bavaria, president of the Association of the Research Ethics Committees in Germany and a member of the Expert Group on Clinical Trials of the European Commission. He has been  influential in the study of safety of drugs and pharmacoepidemiology. He was one of the first biostatisticians to look at reliably compiled drug dosing history data in light of pharmacometric consequences.  He is the namesake of the Hasford Score, a prognostic score for chronic myeloid leukemia.

Career 
Joerg Hasford received his training as a physician at Freie Universität Berlin and Ludwig-Maximilians-Universitaet München in Munich, Bavaria. He graduated in 1979 and received his Dr.med. with honors from Freie Universität Berlin in 1980. From 1979 until 1990 he worked at the Biometric Centre for Therapeutic Studies, a nonprofit institution in Munich; from 1984 until 1990 he was its scientific director. In 1989 he received his Habilitation for Medical Biometry and Epidemiology at the Ludwig Maximilians Universitaet in Munich, where he was appointed full tenure professor in 1994. Hasford served as Associate Editor for Controlled Clinical Trials from 1995–2000; Editor for Europe of Pharmacoepidemiology and Drug Safety from 2008–2015. Upon departing this editorship in 2015, he was commended with the following statement: “Professor Hasford began processing European manuscripts in 2007 with founding editor Ronald Mann, and assumed the role of Regional Editor for all of Europe in 2008. The following year, submissions to Europe totaled 129 for the year, one-third of all submissions to Pharmacoepidemiology and Drug Safety. By 2014, he managed more than 200 manuscripts. Professor Hasford was awarded a certificate at the 31st International Conference on Pharmacoepidemiology and Therapeutic Risk Management in Boston, Massachusetts, in August, 2015, in recognition of his dedication and commitment as Regional Editor for Europe.”

He is a founding member of the German Drug Utilization Research Group and of the International Society of Pharmacovigilance.   He currently is chairman of the Ethics Committee of the Physicians’ Chamber of the Free State of Bavaria and is president of the Association of the Research Ethics Committees in Germany. He is a member of the Expert Group on Clinical Trials of the European Commission.

Research 
Since 1983, Hasford serves as the responsible biostatistician of the German Chronic Myeloid Leukemia Study Group which runs randomized long term clinical trials. He performs prognostic research and has published as the main author several properly validated prognostic scores for chronic myeloid leukemia and lymphoma including the Hasford Score. In pharmacoepidemiology, he specializes in drug utilization research, in particular with pregnant women and with pharmacy claims data, patients’ compliance and persistence. He is a member of the European Network of Centres for Pharmacoepidemiology and Pharmacovigilance which is coordinated by the European Medicines Agency.

Awards 
 Hasford and his coauthors received the Paul Martini Prize for the development and validation of a new prognostic score for patients with Chronic Myeloid Leukemia in 2000.
 Hasford with colleagues received the Felix Burda Preis for Medical Prevention in 2003.
 Hasford became a Fellow of the Society for Clinical Trials in 2008.

Publications 
Hasford has authored and coauthored over 200 Medline-listed publications

References 

1950 births
Physicians from Munich
German epidemiologists
Academic staff of the Ludwig Maximilian University of Munich
Free University of Berlin alumni
Living people